Radical 75 or radical tree meaning "tree" is one of the 34 Kangxi radicals (214 radicals in total) composed of 4 strokes.

In the Kangxi Dictionary, there are 1,369 characters (out of 49,030) to be found under this radical.

 is also the 64th indexing component in the Table of Indexing Chinese Character Components predominantly adopted by Simplified Chinese dictionaries published in mainland China, with its alternative form  being its associated indexing component.

In the Chinese Wu Xing ("Five Phases"), 木 represents the element Wood.

Evolution

Derived characters

Literature

External links

Unihan Database - U+6728

075
064